David Blackburn may refer to:

 David Blackburn (artist) (1939–2016), British landscape artist
 David Blackburn (footballer) (born 1956), Australian rules footballer
 David Blackburn (speedway rider) (born 1962), British motorcycle speedway rider
 David Anthony Blackburn (born 1945), British naval officer
 David Blackburn (Royal Navy officer) (1753–1795)
 David Blackburn (film editor) (born 1967), British film editor